The Gay People's Chronicle was a free, biweekly newspaper published by KWIR Publications, reporting news and current events concerning the gay community of the state of Ohio.  It was founded in February 1985 by Charles Callender, a Case Western Reserve University anthropology professor.  Originally, it was published monthly for the Cleveland area, but later it could be found statewide, as well as in neighboring communities of Northern Kentucky, Pennsylvania, and West Virginia. It ceased publication on December 25, 2015.

References
  Stonewall Columbus
   Cleveland’s Gay People’s Chronicle closes, now up for sale

External links
Gay People's Chronicle — official website

1985 establishments in Ohio
LGBT culture in Pennsylvania
LGBT in Kentucky
LGBT in Ohio
LGBT in West Virginia
LGBT-related newspapers published in the United States
Newspapers published in Ohio
Publications established in 1985